is a 2015 Japanese war drama film directed by Itsumichi Isomura. It was released in Japan on June 6, 2015.

Cast
Kyōka Suzuki
Mirai Shida
Takahiro Miura
Takehiro Hira
Seiichi Tanabe
Kazuki Namioka

Reception
On its opening weekend, the film earned  at the Japanese box office.

References

External links
 

2015 war drama films
Japanese war drama films
2015 drama films
2015 films
Films scored by Toshiyuki Watanabe
Films directed by Itsumichi Isomura
Japanese World War II films
2010s Japanese films

ja:おかあさんの木#映画（実写版）